The Miami Marlins' 2018 season was the 26th season for the Major League Baseball (MLB) franchise in the National League and the 7th as the "Miami" Marlins. Don Mattingly was the manager of the Marlins for a third year. The Marlins played their home games at Marlins Park as members of the National League East Division. They failed to make the playoffs for the 15th consecutive season.

This year marked the first season under the new ownership group led by Derek Jeter and Bruce Sherman.

Offseason

Ownership 
On October 2, 2017, following the conclusion of the 2017 season, the Marlins were officially sold to a group led by Derek Jeter and Bruce Sherman for $1.2 billion.

The Jeter Era 
The deal that made Derek Jeter CEO of the Marlins was closed the day after the Marlins concluded the 2017 season. Jeter has roughly 4 percent stake in the ownership group, while Sherman has about 46 percent.

As CEO, Jeter plans to measure the success of the Marlins by more than just the score. Emphasis will be placed on the overall fan experience and embracing the culture in Miami.

Trades 
On Dec. 7, 2017, the Marlins traded Dee Gordon and $1 million in international slot money to the Seattle Mariners for 3 minor leaguers. Two days later, the Marlins traded Giancarlo Stanton and $30 million in contract relief to the New York Yankees for Starlin Castro and two minor leaguers. The deal was made official on Dec. 11.

On Dec. 19, 2017, the Marlins traded Marcell Ozuna to the St. Louis Cardinals for two minor leaguers.

On Jan. 25, 2018, the Marlins traded Christian Yelich to the Milwaukee Brewers for Lewis Brinson and three other minor leaguers.

Jose Ureña 
On August 15, 2018 starting pitcher Jose Ureña intentionally hit Ronald Acuña with a 98 MPH fastball on the elbow resulting to an ejection and controversy of the situation with the benches clearing.
'Regular season

Season standings

Record vs. opponents

 Game log 

|-style=background:#fcc
|1||March 29|| Cubs || 4–8 || Cishek (1–0) || Ureña (0–1) || — || 32,151 || 0–1 || L1
|-style=background:#cfc
|2||March 30|| Cubs || 2–1 (17) || Despaigne (1–0) || Butler (0–1) ||—|| 12,034 || 1–1 || W1
|-style=background:#fcc
|3||March 31|| Cubs || 6–10 (10) || Strop (1–0) || Ziegler (0–1) ||—|| 13,422 || 1–2 || L1
|-

|-style=background:#cfc
|4||April 1|| Cubs || 6–0 || Peters (1–0) || Quintana (0–1) ||—|| 10,428 || 2–2 || W1
|-style=background:#fcc
|5||April 2|| Red Sox || 3–7 || Johnson (1–0) || Richards (0–1) ||—|| 11,113 || 2–3 || L1
|-style=background:#fcc
|6||April 3|| Red Sox || 2–4 (13) || Hembree (1–0) || Guerrero (0–1) ||—|| 14,953 || 2–4 || L2
|-style=background:#fcc
|7||April 5||@ Phillies || 0–5 || Pivetta (1–0) || Smith (0–1) ||—|| 44,488 || 2–5 || L3
|-style=background:#fcc
|8||April 7||@ Phillies || 1–20 || Velasquez (1–1)||Peters (1–1)|| Thompson (1) || 33,660 || 2–6 || L4
|-style=background:#cfc
|9||April 8||@ Phillies || 6–3 || Despaigne (2–0) || García (0–1) || Ziegler (1)|| 34,326 || 3–6 || W1
|-style=background:#fcc
|10||April 9|| Mets || 2–4 || Syndergaard (2–0) || Ureña (0–2) || Familia (5) || 7,003 || 3–7 || L1
|-style=background:#fcc
|11||April 10|| Mets || 6–8 || Robles (2–0) || Ziegler (0–2) || Familia (6) || 6,516 || 3–8 || L2
|-style=background:#fcc
|12||April 11|| Mets || 1–4 || Wheeler (1–0) || O'Grady (0–1) ||—|| 6,150 || 3–9 || L3
|-style=background:#cfc
|13||April 13|| Pirates || 7–2 || Peters (2–1) || Kuhl (1–1) ||—|| 6,852 || 4–9 || W1
|-style=background:#fcc
|14||April 14|| Pirates || 0–1 || Kontos (1–1) || Ziegler (0–3) || Vázquez (5) || 26,816 || 4–10 || L1
|-style=background:#fcc
|15||April 15|| Pirates || 3–7 || Nova (2–1) || Ureña (0–3) ||—|| 10,621 || 4–11 || L2
|-style=background:#fcc
|16||April 16||@ Yankees || 1–12 || Severino (3–1) || Smith (0–2) ||—|| 35,525 || 4–12 || L3
|-style=background:#cfc
|17||April 17||@ Yankees || 9–1 || García (1–0) || Tanaka (2–2) ||—|| 34,005 || 5–12 || W1
|-style=background:#fcc
|18||April 19||@ Brewers || 3–12 || Anderson (2–1) || Peters (2–2) ||—|| 26,087 || 5–13 || L1
|-style=background:#fcc
|19||April 20||@ Brewers || 0–8 || Chacín (1–1) || Richards (0–2) ||—|| 28,233 || 5–14 || L2
|-style=background:#fcc
|20||April 21||@ Brewers || 5–6 || Jeffress (2–0) || Tazawa (0–1) ||—|| 37,175 || 5–15 || L3
|-style=background:#fcc
|21||April 22||@ Brewers || 2–4 || Guerra (2–0) || Smith (0–3) || Hader (3) || 37,015 || 5–16 || L4
|-style=background:#fcc
|22||April 23||@ Dodgers || 1–2 || Liberatore (1–0) || Barraclough (0–1) || Fields (1) || 46,909 || 5–17 || L5
|-style=background:#cfc
|23||April 24||@ Dodgers || 3–2 || Steckenrider (1–0) || Báez (0–1) || Ziegler (2) || 39,284 || 6–17 || W1
|-style=background:#cfc
|24||April 25||@ Dodgers || 8–6 || González (1–0) || Kershaw (1–4) ||—|| 39,004 || 7–17 || W2
|-style=background:#fcc
|25||April 27|| Rockies || 0–1 || Senzatela (2–1) || Ureña (0–4) || Davis (10) || 5,931 || 7–18 || L1
|-style=background:#cfc
|26||April 28|| Rockies || 4–1 || Chen (1–0) || Márquez (1–3) || Barraclough (1) || 9,659 || 8–18 || W1
|-style=background:#cfc
|27||April 29|| Rockies || 3–0 || Smith (1–3) || Bettis (3–1) || Ziegler (3) || 11,203 || 9–18 || W2
|-style=background:#cfc
|28||April 30|| Phillies || 8–4 || González (2–0) || Arrieta (3–1) ||—|| 5,415 || 10–18 || W3
|-

|-style=background:#cfc
|29||May 1|| Phillies || 2–1 (10) || Tazawa (1–1) || Ríos (3–1) ||—|| 5,415 || 11–18 || W4
|-style=background:#fcc
|30||May 2|| Phillies || 0–6 || Nola (4–1) || Ureña (0–5) ||—|| 5,941 || 11–19 || L1
|-style=background:#fcc
|31||May 4||@ Reds || 1–4 || Romano (2–3) || Chen (1–1) || Iglesias (4) || 22,610 || 11–20 || L2
|-style=background:#cfc
|32||May 5||@ Reds || 6–0 || Smith (2–3) || Mahle (2–4) ||—|| 19,609 || 12–20 || W1
|-style=background:#cfc
|33||May 6||@ Reds || 8–5 || Wittgren (1–0) || Finnegan (0–3) || Ziegler (4) || 19,800 || 13–20 || W2
|-style=background:#fcc
|34||May 7||@ Cubs ||2–14||Hendricks (3-2)||García (1-1)||—||37,333||13-21||L1
|-style=background:#fcc
|35||May 8||@ Cubs ||3–4||Edwards Jr (1-0)||Barraclough (0-2)||Morrow (8)||40,051||13-22||L2
|-style=background:#fcc
|36||May 9||@ Cubs ||4–13||Quintana (4-2)||Chen (1-2)||—||34,486||13-23||L3
|-style=background:#fcc
|37||May 10|| Braves ||2–9||Foltynewicz (3-2)||Smith (2-4)||Gohara (1)||8,277||13-24||L4
|-style=background:#cfc
|38||May 11|| Braves ||6–3||Straily (1–0)||McCarthy (4-2)||Ziegler (5)||9,149||14-24||W1
|-style=background:#fcc
|39||May 12|| Braves || 5–10 ||Minter (1–0) ||Steckenrider (1–1) ||—||12,383 ||14–25 ||L1
|-style=background:#fcc
|40||May 13|| Braves || 3–4 || Newcomb (4-1)||Ureña (0-6)||Vizcaíno (7)||7,435 ||14–26 ||L2
|-style=background:#cfc
|41||May 15|| Dodgers || 4–2 ||Wittgren (2–0) || Wood (0–4) || Ziegler (6) || 6,242 || 15–26|| W1
|-style=background:#cfc
|42||May 16|| Dodgers || 6–5 || Steckenrider (2–1) || Báez (1–2) || Ziegler (7) || 5,721 || 16–26|| W2
|-style=background:#fcc
|43||May 17|| Dodgers || 0–7 || Maeda (3–3) || Smith (2–5) ||—|| 13,820 || 16–27 || L1
|-style=background:#cfc
|44||May 18||@ Braves || 2–0 || Straily (2–0) || Wisler (1–1) || Ziegler (8) || 27,705 || 17–27 || W1
|-style=background:#fcc
|45||May 19||@ Braves || 1–8 || Newcomb (5–1) || Ureña (0–7) ||—|| 37,715 || 17-28 || L1
|-style=background:#fcc
|46||May 20||@ Braves || 9–10 || Minter (3–0) || Guerrero (0–2) ||—|| 28,352 || 17–29 || L2
|-style=background:#fcc
|47||May 21||@ Mets || 0–2 || Vargas (3–0) || Hernández (0–1) || Familia (13) || 22,505 || 17–30 || L3
|-style=background:#cfc
|48||May 22||@ Mets || 5–1 || Smith (3–5) || Wheeler (2–4) ||—|| 22,195 || 18–30 || W1
|-style=background:#cfc
|49||May 23||@ Mets || 2–1 || Conley (1–0) || Familia (2–2) || Ziegler (9) || 24,808 || 19–30 || W2
|-style=background:#fcc
|50||May 25|| Nationals || 5–9 || Scherzer (8–1) || Wittgren (2–1) || Doolittle (10) || 7,512 || 19–31 || L1
|-style=background:#fcc
|51||May 26|| Nationals || 1–4 || Miller (1–0) || Ziegler (0–4) || Doolittle (11) || 11,646 || 19–32 || L2
|-style=background:#fcc
|52||May 27|| Nationals || 2–5 || Strasburg (6–4) || Hernández (0–2) || Kintzler (2) || 11,641 || 19–33 || L3
|-style=background:#cfc
|53||May 28||@ Padres || 7–2 || Smith (4–5) || Lauer (1–3) ||—|| 27,932 || 20–33 || W1
|-style=background:#fcc
|54||May 29||@ Padres || 5–9 || Stammen (3–0) || Straily (2–1) ||—|| 16,321 || 20–34 || L1
|-style=background:#fcc
|55||May 30||@ Padres || 2–3 || Strahm (1–2) || Ziegler (0–5) ||—|| 15,733 || 20–35 || L2
|-style=background:#fcc
|56||May 31||@ Padres || 3–8 || Lyles (2–1) || Chen (1–3) || Hand (17) || 17,373 || 20–36 || L3
|-

|-style=background:#fcc
|57||June 1||@ Diamondbacks || 1–9 || Buchholz (1–1) || Hernández (0–3) ||—|| 25,866 || 20–37 || L4
|-style=background:#fcc
|58||June 2||@ Diamondbacks || 2–6 || Greinke (4–4) || Smith (4–6) ||—|| 34,117 || 20–38 || L5
|-style=background:#fcc
|59||June 3||@ Diamondbacks || 1–6 || Koch (4–3) || Straily (2–2) ||—|| 31,727 || 20–39 || L6
|-style=background:#cfc
|60||June 5||@ Cardinals || 7–4 || Ureña (1–7) || Guilmet (0–1) || Barraclough (2) || 40,070 || 21–39 || W1
|-style=background:#cfc
|61||June 6||@ Cardinals || 11–3 || Rucinski (1–0) || Flaherty (2–2) ||—|| 40,109 || 22–39 || W2
|-style=background:#fcc
|62||June 7||@ Cardinals || 1–4 || Mikolas (7–1) || Richards (0–3) || Norris (12) || 41,297 || 22–40 || L1
|-style=background:#cfc
|63||June 8|| Padres || 4–0 || Smith (5–6) || Lauer (2–4) ||—|| 10,654 || 23–40 || W1
|-style=background:#fcc
|64||June 9|| Padres || 4–5 || Stammen (4–0) || Rucinski (1–1) || Yates (2) || 12,089 || 23–41 || L1
|-style=background:#fcc
|65||June 10|| Padres || 1–3 || Richard (5–6) || Ureña (1–8) || Hand (19) || 12,984 || 23–42 || L2
|-style=background:#cfc
|66||June 11|| Giants || 7–5 || Conley (2–0) || Dyson (2–1) || Barraclough (3) || 6,023 || 24–42 || W1
|-style=background:#cfc
|67||June 12|| Giants || 3–1 || Richards (1–3) || Stratton (7–4) || Barraclough (4) || 5,928 || 25–42 || W2
|-style=background:#cfc
|68||June 13|| Giants || 5–4 || Steckenrider (3–1) || Moronta (2–1) ||—|| 6,075 || 26–42 || W3
|-style=background:#fcc
|69||June 14|| Giants || 3–6 (16) || Blach (4–5) || Hernández (0–4) || Dyson (1) || 9,726 || 26–43 || L1
|-style=background:#cfc
|70||June 15||@ Orioles || 2–0 || Ureña (2–8) || Gausman (3–6) || Barraclough (5) || 23,968 || 27–43 || W1
|-style=background:#cfc
|71||June 16||@ Orioles || 5–4 || Chen (2–3) || Cobb (2–9) || Steckenrider (1) || 23,948 || 28–43 || W2
|-style=background:#fcc
|72||June 17||@ Orioles || 4–10 || Bundy (5–7) || Richards (1–4) ||—|| 21,421 || 28–44 || L1
|-style=background:#cfc
|73||June 18||@ Giants || 5–4 || Guerrero (1–2) || Strickland (3–3) || Barraclough (6) || 36,743 || 29–44 || W1
|-style=background:#fcc
|74||June 19||@ Giants || 3–6 || Rodríguez (2–1) || Straily (2–3) || Dyson (2) || 37,242 || 29–45 || L1
|-style=background:#fcc
|75||June 20||@ Giants || 5–6 || Holland (5–7) || Ureña (2–9) ||  Moronta (1)|| 35,903 || 29–46 || L2
|-style=background:#fcc
|76||June 22||@ Rockies || 3–11 || Gray (7–7) || Chen (2–4) ||—|| 35,468 || 29–47 || L3
|-style=background:#cfc
|77||June 23||@ Rockies || 6–2 || Richards (2–4) || Anderson (4–3) || — || 39,032 || 30–47 || W1
|-style=background:#cfc
|78||June 24||@ Rockies ||  8–5 || Rucinski (2–1) || Márquez (5–8) || Barraclough (7) || 34,172 || 31–47 || W2
|-style=background:#cfc
|79||June 25|| Diamondbacks || 9–5 || Straily (3–3) || Miller (0–1) || — || 6,105 || 32–47 || W3
|-style=background:#fcc
|80||June 26|| Diamondbacks || 3–5 || Godley (9–5) || Hernández (0–5) || Boxberger (18) || 6,159 || 32–48 || L1
|-style=background:#fcc
|81||June 27|| Diamondbacks || 1–2 || Ray (3–0) || Chen (2–5) || Boxberger (19) || 6,382 || 32–49 || L2
|-style=background:#fcc
|82||June 28|| Diamondbacks || 0–4 || Greinke (8–5) || Richards (2–5) || — || 12,715 || 32–50 || L3
|-style=background:#cfc
|83||June 29|| Mets || 8–2 || Alcantara (1–0) || Oswalt (0–1) ||—|| 8,211 || 33–50 || W1
|-style=background:#cfc
|84||June 30|| Mets || 5–2 || Lopez (1–0) || deGrom (5–4) || Barraclough (8) || 10,523 || 34–50 || W2
|-

|-style=background:#fcc
|85||July 1|| Mets || 2–5 || Matz (4–5) || Straily (3–4) || Familia (15) || 9,611 || 34–51 || L1
|-style=background:#cfc
|86||July 2|| Rays || 3–2 (10) || Rucinski (3–1) || Stanek (1–2) || — || 6,004 || 35–51 || W1
|-style=background:#fcc
|87||July 3|| Rays || 6–9 (16) || Nuño (3–0) || Graves (0–1) || Alvarado (3) || 6,259 || 35–52 || L1
|-style=background:#cfc
|88||July 4|| Rays || 3–0 || Rucinski (4–1) || Weber (0–1) || Ziegler (10) || 7,572 || 36–52 || W1
|-style=background:#fcc
|89||July 5||@ Nationals || 12–14 || Kelley (1–0) || Conley (2–1) || Doolittle (22) || 24,314 || 36–53 || L1
|-style=background:#fcc
|90||July 6||@ Nationals || 2–3 || Doolittle (3–2) || Barraclough (0–3) || — || 32,652 || 36–54 || L2
|-style=background:#fcc
|91||July 7||@ Nationals || 4–18 || Scherzer (11–5) || Chen (2–6) || — || 34,364 || 36–55 || L3
|-style=background:#cfc
|92||July 8||@ Nationals || 10–2 || Conley (3–1) || Roark (3–11) || — || 30,464 || 37–55 || W1
|-style=background:#cfc
|93||July 9|| Brewers || 4–3 (10) || Ziegler (1–5) || Knebel (2–1) ||—|| 5,996 || 38–55 || W2
|-style=background:#fcc
|94||July 10|| Brewers || 4–8 || Chacín (8–3) || López (1–1) || Burnes (1)|| 5,624 || 38–56 || L1
|-style=background:#cfc
|95||July 11|| Brewers || 5–4 (12) || Hernández (1–5) || López ||—|| 5,265 || 39–56 || W1
|-style=background:#fcc
|96||July 13|| Phillies || 0–2 || Arrieta (7–6) || Chen (2–7) || Neshek (1) || 8,090 || 39–57 || L1
|-style=background:#cfc
|97||July 14|| Phillies || 2–0 || Richards (3–5) || Nola (12–3) || Barraclough (9)|| 14,793 || 40–57 || W1
|-style=background:#cfc
|98||July 15|| Phillies || 10–5 || Hernández (2–5) || Ramos (3–1) ||—|| 8,829 || 41–57 || W2
|- bgcolor=bbcaff
| rowspan=3 |ASG || colspan=8 | 89th All-Star Game at Nationals Park in Washington, District of Columbia, United States || rowspan=3 | Box   
|- bgcolor=ffbbbb  
| July 17 || colspan=2 |  NL All-Stars 6, AL All-Stars 8 (10) || Díaz  (SEA) || Stripling (LAD) || Happ (TOR) ||  43,843 ||AL 44–43–2
|- style="text-align:center; bgcolor="bbcaff"
| colspan=8 |Representing the Marlins: J. T. Realmuto 
|-style=background:#cfc
|99||July 20||@ Rays || 6–5 || Straily (4–4) || Castillo (1–1) || Conley (1)|| 13,248 || 42–57 || W3
|-style=background:#cfc
|100||July 21||@ Rays || 3–2 || López (2–1) || Yarbrough (8–5) ||Barraclough (10) || 13,808 || 43–57 || W4
|-style=background:#fcc
|101||July 22||@ Rays || 4–6 || Kolarek (1–0) || Barraclough (0–4) ||—|| 11,828 || 43–58 || L1
|-style=background:#fcc
|102||July 23|| Braves || 1–12 || Newcomb (9–5) || Ureña (2–10) ||—|| 8.259 || 43–59 || L2
|-style=background:#cfc
|103||July 24|| Braves || 9–3 || Chen (3–7) || Teherán (7–7) ||—|| 21,673 || 44–59 || W1
|-style=background:#fcc
|104||July 26|| Nationals || 3–10 || Miller (6–1) || Conley (3–2) || — || 8,506 || 44–60 || L1
|-style=background:#fcc
|105||July 27|| Nationals || 1–9 || Scherzer (14–5) || López (2–2) || — || 9,297 || 44–61 || L2
|-style=background:#cfc
|106||July 28|| Nationals || 2–1 (10) || Graves (1–1) || Herrera (2–2) || — || 11,779 || 45–61 || W1
|-style=background:#cfc
|107||July 29|| Nationals || 5–0 || Ureña (3–10) || Hellickson (4–2) || — || 12,112 || 46–61 || W2
|-style=background:#fcc
|108||July 30||@ Braves || 3–5 || Teherán (8–7) || Chen (3–8) || Minter (6) || 21,230 || 46–62 || L1
|-style=background:#fcc
|109||July 31||@ Braves || 6–11 || Allard (1–0) || Straily (4–5)|| — || 18,627 || 46–63 || L2
|-

|-style=background:#bbb
|–||August 1||@ Braves || colspan=7|Postponed (rain): Rescheduled for August 13 as part of a doubleheader.
|-style=background:#fcc
|110||August 2||@ Phillies || 2–5 || Hunter (3–1) || Barraclough (0–5) || — || 26,050 || 46–64 || L3
|-style=background:#fcc
|111||August 3||@ Phillies || 1–5 || Velasquez (8–8) || Richards (3–6) || Domínguez (12) || 33,737 || 46–65 || L4
|-style=background:#fcc
|112||August 4||@ Phillies || 3–8 || Eflin (8–3) || Ureña (3–11) || — || 35,194 || 46–66 || L5
|-style=background:#fcc
|113||August 5||@ Phillies || 3–5 || Neshek (1–0) || Steckenrider (3–2) || Hunter (2) || 42,343 || 46–67 || L6
|-style=background:#cfc
|114||August 6|| Cardinals || 3–2 || Chen (4-8) || Weaver (6-10) || Guerra (1) || 8,563 || 47-67 || W1
|-style=background:#fcc
|115||August 7|| Cardinals || 2-3 || Mikolas (12-3)  || Hernández (2-6) || Norris (22) || 7,230 || 47–68 || L1
|-style=background:#fcc
|116||August 8|| Cardinals || 1–7 || Gant (4-4) || Richards (3-7)  || — || 7,306 || 47–69 || L2
|-style=background:#fcc
|117||August 10|| Mets|| 2–6 || Wheeler (7–6) || Ureña (3–12) ||—|| 6,993 || 47–70 || L3
|-style=background:#cfc
|118||August 11|| Mets || 4–3 (11) || Guerra (1–0) || Rhame (0–2) || — || 11,478 || 48–70 || W1
|-style=background:#fcc
|119||August 12|| Mets || 3–4 || Syndergaard (8–2)|| Chen (4–9)|| Lugo (1) || 8,964 || 48–71 || L1
|-style=background:#fcc
|120||August 13 (1)||@ Braves || 1–9 || Toussaint (1–0) || López (2–3) || — || 16,049 || 48–72 || L2
|-style=background:#fcc
|121||August 13 (2)||@ Braves || 1–6 || Foltynewicz (10–7) || González (2–1) || — || 18,186 || 48–73 || L3
|-style=background:#fcc
|122||August 14||@ Braves || 6–10 || Biddle (4–1) || Conley (3–3) || — || 19,409 || 48–74 || L4
|-style=background:#fcc
|123||August 15||@ Braves || 2–5 || Gausman (7–9)|| García (1–2) || Minter (11) || 19,045 || 48–75 || L5
|-style=background:#fcc
|124||August 17||@ Nationals || 2–8 || Scherzer (16–5) || Straily (4–6) || — || 37,106 || 48–76 || L6
|-style=background:#cfc
|125||August 18||@ Nationals || 7–5 (10) || Steckenrider (4–2) || Glover (0–2) || Graves (1) || 30,900 || 49–76 || W1
|-style=background:#cfc
|126||August 19||@ Nationals || 12–1 || Ureña (4–12) || González (7–10) || — || 31,435 || 50–76 || W2
|-style=background:#fcc
|127||August 21|| Yankees || 1–2 (12) || Cole (4–1) || Guerra (1–1) || Kahnle (1) || 26,275 || 50–77 || L1
|-style=background:#cfc
|128||August 22|| Yankees || 9–3 || García (2–2) || Lynn (8–9) || — || 25,547 || 51–77 || W1
|-style=background:#fcc
|129||August 23|| Braves || 0-5 || Newcomb (11-6) || Hernandez (2-7) || — || 6,587 || 51–78 || L1
|-style=background:#cfc
|130||August 24|| Braves || 1-0 || Straily (5-6) || Foltynewicz (10-8) || Conley (2) || 7,792 || 52–78 || W1
|-style=background:#cfc
|131||August 25|| Braves || 3-1 || Chen (5-9) || Sánchez (6-5) || Steckenrider (2) || 7,823 || 53–78 || W2
|-style=background:#fcc
|132||August 26|| Braves || 0-4 || Gausman (9-9) || López (2-4) || — || 12,770 || 53–79 || L1
|-style=background:#fcc
|133||August 28||@ Red Sox|| 7–8 || Kimbrel (4–1) || Steckenrider (4–3) || — || 36,708 || 53–80 || L2
|-style=background:#fcc
|134||August 29||@ Red Sox || 6–14 || Thornburg (2–0) || Conley (3–4) || — || 36,628 || 53–81 || L3
|-style=background:#fcc
|135||August 31|| Blue Jays || 5–6 || Biagini (3–7) || Steckenrider (4–4) || Giles (19) || 8,871 || 53–82 || L4
|-

|-style=background:#cfc
|136||September 1|| Blue Jays || 6–3 ||  Chen (6–9) || Estrada (7–11) || — || 11,174 || 54–82 || W1
|-style=background:#fcc
|137||September 2|| Blue Jays || 1–6 || Reid-Foley (1–2) || Brigham (0–1) || — || 9,617 || 54–83 || L1
|-style=background:#cfc
|138||September 3|| Phillies || 3–1 || Ureña (5–12) || Velasquez (9–10) || Steckenrider (3) || 7,771 || 55–83 || W1
|-style=background:#fcc
|139||September 4|| Phillies || 4–9 || Arrieta (10–9) || Richards (3–8) || — || 7,131 ||  55–84 || L1
|-style=background:#cfc
|140||September 5|| Phillies || 2–1 || Alcántara (2–0) || Pivetta (7–11) || Steckenrider (4) || 6,427 || 56–84 || W1
|-style=background:#fcc
|141||September 7||@ Pirates || 3–5 || Rodríguez (4–2) || Guerrero (1–3) || Vázquez (31) || 19,515 || 56–85 || L1
|-style=background:#fcc
|142||September 8||@ Pirates || 1–5 || Nova (8–9) || Chen (6–10) || — || 16,110 || 56–86 || L2
|-style=background:#bbb
|—||September 9||@ Pirates || colspan=7|Cancelled (rain; will not be made up)
|-style=background:#bbb
|—||September 10||@ Mets || colspan=7|Postponed (rain): Rescheduled for September 12 as part of a doubleheader.
|-style=background:#cfc
|143||September 11||@ Mets || 5–3 || Ureña (6–12) || deGrom (8–9) || — || 20,849 || 57–86 || W1
|-style=background:#fcc
|144||September 12 (1)||@ Mets || 0–13 || Wheeler (11–7) || Richards (3–9) || — || 20,423 || 57–87 ||L1
|-style=background:#bbb
|—||September 12 (2)||@ Mets ||  colspan=7|Postponed (rain): Rescheduled for September 13 as part of a doubleheader.
|-style=background:#fcc
|145||September 13 (1)||@ Mets || 3–4 || Blevins (3–2) || Barraclough (0–6) || — || rowspan=2|22,640 || 57–88 || L2
|-style=background:#fcc
|146||September 13 (2)||@ Mets || 2–5 || Vargas (6–9) || Brigham (0–2) || Gsellman (11) || 57–89 || L3
|-style=background:#fcc
|147||September 14||@ Phillies || 2–14 || Eflin (10–7) || Chen (6–11) || — || 21,671 || 57–90 || L4
|-style=background:#fcc
|148||September 15||@ Phillies || 4–5 || García (3–1) || Rucinski (4–2) || Neshek (5) || 24,695 || 57–91 || L5
|-style=background:#cfc
|149||September 16||@ Phillies || 6–4 || Ureña (7–12) || Pivetta (7–13) || — || 30,040 || 58–91 || W1
|-style=background:#cfc
|150||September 17|| Nationals || 8–5 || García (3–2) || Glover (1–3) || Conley (3) || 8,440 || 59–91 || W2
|-style=background:#fcc
|151||September 18|| Nationals || 2–4 || Strasburg (9–7) || Alcántara (2–1) || Doolittle (25) || 7,726 || 59–92 || L1
|-style=background:#fcc
|152||September 20|| Reds || 2–4 || Reed (1–2) || Brigham (0–3) || Iglesias (29) || 9,863 || 59–93 || L2
|-style=background:#cfc
|153||September 21|| Reds || 1–0 (10) || Barraclough (1–6) || Hernandez (5–2) || — || 11,471 || 60–93 || W1
|-style=background:#cfc
|154||September 22|| Reds || 5–1 || Ureña (8–12) || DeSclafani (7–7) || Steckenrider (5) || 12,559 || 61–93 || W2
|-style=background:#cfc
|155||September 23|| Reds || 6–0 || Richards (4–9) || Lorenzen (3–2) || — || 13,595 || 62–93 || W3
|-style=background:#fcc
|156||September 24||@ Nationals || 3–7 || Miller (7–1) || Alcántara (2–2) || — || 22,428 || 62–94 || L1
|-style=background:#fcc
|157||September 25||@ Nationals || 4–9 || Scherzer (18–7) || Brigham (0–4) || — || 26,483 || 62–95 || L2
|-style=background:#fcc
|158||September 26||@ Nationals || 3–9 (7) || Suero (4–1) || Chen (6–12) || — ||  28,680 ||  62–96 || L3
|-style=background:#cfc
|159||September 28||@ Mets || 8–1 || Ureña (9–12) || Sewald (0–7) || — || 27,045 || 63–96 || W1
|-style=background:#fcc
|160||September 29||@ Mets || 0–1 (13) || Zamora (1–0) || García (3–3) || — || 43,928 || 63–97 || L1
|-style=background:#fcc
|161||September 30||@ Mets || 0–1 || Syndergaard (13–4) || Alcántara' (2–3) || — || 28,346 || 63–98 || L2
|-

|- style="text-align:center;"
| Legend:       = Win       = Loss       = PostponementBold = Marlins team member

Roster

Farm system

See also

References

External links
2018 Miami Marlins season at Baseball Reference''

Miami Marlins season
Miami Marlins
Miami Marlins seasons